Showing Up for Racial Justice (SURJ) is a network organizing white people for racial and economic justice. SURJ was founded in 2009 amidst the backlash to election of Barack Obama as the first black President of the United States. SURJ seeks to bring more white people into racial justice work and to find mutual interest with Black and POC led movements.

History 
Black activists and intellectuals from Malcolm X to Toni Morrison have argued for decades that white people bear the primary responsibility for rooting out racism. Carla F. Wallace, SURJ co-founder, said the aim is to engage white people in a larger racial justice movement led by people of color. She asks "what is our mutual interest in working for a different society? ... We must move from it being something that we do when we have time on a Saturday to something that we do because our lives depend on it."

Tactics 
One SURJ tactic is deep canvassing, using the power of personal narrative in lengthy non-judgmental conversations to build white support for racial justice. SURJ focuses on “calling in” White people to support racial justice grounded in the vision of Black leaders. SURJ says it’s White people’s responsibility to do anti-racism work and not rely on POC to teach White people about racism.

Criminal justice reform 
Following the George Floyd protests against police brutality, some have had challenging conversations with family members. SURJ developed a toolkit for discussing protests and police violence. Anger towards the criminal justice system can be used to bring about change if people speak up. Other actions include electoral work, where sheriffs can address reforms in the criminal legal system and mass incarceration. SURJ also works to end cash bail.

Police accountability 
SURJ called for police accountability and strengthened oversight in the San Diego County jail. SURJ was part of the Citizens for a Safer Cleveland coalition, whose police accountability initiative created a new Community Policing Commission composed of 13 civilians with final decision-making power regarding discipline in police misconduct cases. In the debate over license plate readers, Melissa Cherry from Nashville chapter of SURJ said she was suspicious of private funding for law enforcement with discussion of defunding the police.

See also 
 Black Lives Matter
 Me and White Supremacy
 Anne Braden

References

External links 
 Showing Up for Racial Justice

Anti-racism in the United States
2009 establishments in the United States
Criminal justice reform in the United States
Social class in the United States
Organizations established in 2009